Yom Tov Samia (born 18 June 1954) is a retired Israeli general. He was  head of the Israel Defense Forces' Southern Command from January 2001 to December 2003. He retired from  military service as a major general.

Biography
Samia was born in Pardesiya, grew up in Netanya, and now lives in Tel Aviv. He holds a Ph.D in sociology and political science. In 1998 he won the Tel Aviv University's Jaffee Center for Strategic Studies's Tshetshik Prize for Israel's Security for his research on "The Organizational Climate of the IDF's Field Units."

Samia was president and CEO of the BARAN Group, is currently (2008) president of "Yam Deshers" LTD, president and CEO of Israel Corp (Biofuels), S. B. Security, Katz Logistics, Orgad Holding, E.D.S. Israel, Girit Celadon Israel (Gates and Checkpoints systems).

He writes for various magazines on issues of national security, such as this 2007 article from the Jerusalem Center for Public Affairs entitled Weapons Smuggling from Egypt to Gaza: What Can Egypt and Israel Do?

References

External links
Guardian Protection Special Profile
Tel Aviv University Webflash
The Peres Center for Peace
Jerusalem Center for Public Affairs

Living people
Israeli generals
Tel Aviv University alumni
University of Haifa alumni
1954 births